Max Silverman (August 25, 1900 – October 5, 1966) was a Canadian ice hockey manager and politician. As president and general manager of the Sudbury Wolves, Silverman and coach Samuel Rothschild led the team to victory in the 1932 Memorial Cup, the 1935 Richardson Cup and the 1938 World Ice Hockey Championships. The team also competed in the 1949 World Ice Hockey Championships, but lost to the Czechoslovakian team.

Silverman sold the team for $17,500 in 1956, and pursued a new career in municipal politics in Sudbury. He served as the city's deputy mayor from 1962 to 1964, and defeated Joe Fabbro for the mayoralty in the municipal election of December 1965. While serving as mayor, he sat on a committee of mayors appointed to study the feasibility of Northern Ontario separating from Ontario to form a new province, alongside G. W. Maybury of Kapuskasing, Ernest Reid of Fort William, Leo Del Villano of Timmins, Merle Dickerson of North Bay and Leo Foucault of Espanola.

He died on October 5, 1966, after less than a year in office.

References

1900 births
1966 deaths
Canada men's national ice hockey team coaches
Mayors of Sudbury, Ontario
Jewish Canadian sportspeople
Businesspeople from Greater Sudbury
Canadian sports businesspeople
Ice hockey people from Ontario
Sportspeople from Greater Sudbury
Jewish mayors of places in Canada